History in Africa: A Journal of Debates, Methods, and Source Analysis is an annual peer-reviewed academic journal covering the historiography and methodology of African history. It is published by Cambridge University Press on behalf of the African Studies Association. The editor-in-chief is Lorelle D. Semley, a historian at College of the Holy Cross. Other editors of the journal include Teresa Barnes (University of Illinois, Urbana-Champaign), Bayo Holsey (Emory University), and Egodi Uchendu (University of Nigeria).

References

External links 
 

Annual journals
English-language journals
African history journals
African studies journals
Cambridge University Press academic journals
Publications established in 1974
Academic journals associated with learned and professional societies